Bathypluta metoeca is a species of moth of the family Tortricidae. It is found on the Lesser Sunda Islands north of Australia.

References

Moths described in 1950
Ceracini